Mātsarya (Sanskrit; Pali: macchariya; Tibetan phonetic: serna) is a Buddhist/Hindu term translated as "stinginess" or "miserliness". It is defined as being incapable of enjoying one’s own possessions and other material objects, clinging to them and being unwilling to part with them or share them with others.

It is identified as:

 One of the twenty subsidiary unwholesome mental factors within the Mahayana Abhidharma teachings. 
 One of the fourteen unwholesome mental factors within the Theravada Abhidharma teachings.
 One of the ten fetters in the Theravada tradition (according to the Dhammasangani)

Definitions

Theravada
The Atthasālinī (II, Book I, Part IX, Chapter II, 257) gives the following definition of avarice (meanness):
 It has, as characteristic, the concealing of one's property, either attained or about to be attained; the not enduring the sharing of one's property in common with others, as function; the shrinking from such sharing or niggardliness or sour feeling as manifestation; one's own property as proximate cause; and it should be regarded as mental ugliness.

Mahayana
The Abhidharma-samuccaya states: 

What is matsarya? It is an over-concern with the material things in life stemming from over-attachment to wealth and honor, and it belongs to passion-lust. Avarice functions as the basis for not letting up in one's concern for the material things of life. 

Alexander Berzin explains:
Miserliness (ser-sna) is a part of longing desire (Sanskrit: raga) and is an attachment to material gain or respect and, not wanting to give up any possessions, clings to them and does not want to share them with others or use them ourselves. Thus, miserliness is more than the English word stinginess. Stinginess is merely unwillingness to share or to use something we possess. It lacks the aspect of hoarding that miserliness possesses.

See also 
 Mental factors (Buddhism)

References

Sources 
 Berzin, Alexander (2006), Primary Minds and the 51 Mental Factors
 Goleman, Daniel (2008). Destructive Emotions: A Scientific Dialogue with the Dalai Lama. Bantam. Kindle Edition.
 Guenther, Herbert V. &  Leslie S. Kawamura (1975), Mind in Buddhist Psychology: A Translation of Ye-shes rgyal-mtshan's "The Necklace of Clear Understanding". Dharma Publishing. Kindle Edition.
 Kunsang, Erik Pema (translator) (2004). Gateway to Knowledge, Vol. 1. North Atlantic Books.

External links 
 Definition of macchariya, Nina van Gorkom

Unwholesome factors in Buddhism
Sanskrit words and phrases